Sunni Muslims view Umar (576-644 AD), the second Rashidun Caliph, in a much more favourable way than Shi'a Muslims, who are of the opinion that he, Abu Bakr and Uthman usurped leadership over Muslims from Ali, Muhammad's son-in-law, and first cousin.

Biography
Umar was one of the prominent companions sahaba of Muhammad. With the conversion of Umar, Islam strengthened and Muslims openly preached Islam. During the space of ten years, Umar succeeded in building the largest empire in the history. Under his leadership the Muslims emerging from the deserts of Arabia overthrew the empire of Persia in the east and shattered the empire of Byzantine in the west.

He was the head of the largest State in the world, and yet he lived the life of a common man. Of simple habits, austere and frugal, he was always accessible to the meanest of his subject, and yet he was a cause of terror for the wrong doer. He would wander about at night to enquire into the condition of the people without any guard or escort.

Family

The exact date of birth of Umar is not known. The consensus, however, is that Umar was born at Mecca around 580 AD. The house in which Umar was born in Mecca was situated midway between Safa and Marwah. During the period of his caliphate, Umar had the house dismantled, and the site was turned into a camping ground. He was younger than the Islamic ProphetMuhammad by about ten years. Muhammad and Umar had Ka'b as their common ancestor in the ninth degree.

Among Umar's ancestors are
Adi, eponym of Umar's tribe, the Banu Adi
Nufayl, Umar's paternal grandfather
Khattab ibn Nufayl, Umar's father
Khantamah, Umar's mother
Hisham ibn al-Mughirah, maternal grandfather of Umar and brother of Walid ibn al-Mughira, who was the father of General Khalid ibn al-Walid. Khalid was thus a cousin of Umar's mother.
Abu Jahl whose personal name was Amr bin Hisham was a brother of Umar's mother, and his maternal uncle.

Umar had several brothers and sisters. The most well known out of these were: Zayd ibn al-Khattab and Fatimah bint al-Khattab. Zayd and Umar were half brothers, their mothers being different. Nevertheless, the two brothers were devoted to each other. When Zayd was later martyred at the Battle of Yamama during the caliphate of Abu Bakr, Umar was highly grieved. He used to say, "Whenever the wind blows from Yamama, it brings me the fragrance of Zayd".

Fatimah was the real sister of Umar. She was married to her cousin Saeed bin Zaid. She played an important role in the conversion of Umar to Islam.

Amr, a brother of Khattab was a paternal uncle of Umar. Zaid, son of Amr and cousin of Umar, was among the distinguished persons of the Quraish, who before the advent of Islam gave up Idolatry, and came to believe in the unity of God. Khattab persecuted Zaid for his religious beliefs. Zaid died before Muhammad announced his prophetic mission. When Muhammad proclaimed his prophethood, Saeed the son of Zaid who had married Umar's sister Fatimah, was among early converts to Islam.

634–644: Umar's era

 states that An-Nawawi said in his Tahdhib:
Umar was the first to adopt the whip. Ibn Sa'd mentions it in the Tabaqat, and he said: It used to be said, after him, 'The whip of 'Umar is more terrible than your sword.'

He (an-Nawawi) continued: He was the first to appoint Qadis in the provinces, the first who established the provinces of (the cities of) Kufah, Basrah, and of Mesopotamia, Syria, Cairo (Egypt), and Mosul.

Legacy

Merits
Sunnis honor him as the following:
One of the Rashidun
One of the Ten Promised Paradise
one of the in-laws of Muhammad
one of the great men of knowledge of the Companions 
one of their abstinent people.
One who opened the Door of Ijtehad, which later helped Muslim jurists in interpretation of Quran and Hadith.

References

Sunni belief and doctrine
Umar